Parveen Kumar Bala is a Fijian politician who served as the Minister for Employment, Productivity, Industrial Relations, Youth and Sports. He previously served as Mayor of the Fijian town of Ba, and subsequently as Special Administrator of Lautoka, Fiji. He is a former president of the Fiji Local Government Association.

Pre-coup
Bala was first elected Mayor of Ba in 1996. He was re-elected unopposed by the town council on 28 October 2005, after leading his National Federation Party (NFP) to a landslide victory in the municipal elections held on 22 October, taking 14 of the 15 seats.

Bala attributed his victory to his policies and personnel. The NFP was, he claimed, the only political party promoting multiracialism and harmony, as evidenced by its multiracial slate of candidates. He accused the Fiji Labour Party of playing "gutter-level politics" in its unsuccessful campaign to oust him.

Bala was also an unsuccessful NFP candidate for the House of Representatives in the 2001 election. He polled 28 percent of the vote in the Ba East Indian Communal Constituency, a marginal improvement on Ram Lajendra's showing in the previous election of 1999. He made another attempt in the 2006 election; his vote dropped marginally, but by considerably less than that of most other NFP candidates in what was a bad year for the party.

On 7 December 2005, the NFP named Bala to a 3-member "negotiating committee", charged with negotiating electoral pacts with other political parties for the parliamentary election due in 2006.

Parveen Bala is the only mayor in Fiji to have served for 12 years continuously.

Post-coup
Following the 2006 coup d'état, Bala was appointed Special Administrator of Lautoka. The new Special Administrator for Ba (a non-elected position roughly analogous to mayor) is Arun Pravad.

He stood as a candidate for the FijiFirst party in the 2014 Fijian general election and was elected with 6,358 votes. He was re-elected in the 2018 Fijian general election with 5,063 votes.

References

Politicians from Lautoka
National Federation Party politicians
Fijian Hindus
Living people
Year of birth missing (living people)
Mayors of Ba (town)
FijiFirst politicians
Government ministers of Fiji
Sports ministers of Fiji
Housing ministers of Fiji
Environment ministers of Fiji
Fijian Tamil politicians